Sheriff is the debut album and only album by Canadian band Sheriff released in 1982 on Capitol Records. The single "When I'm with You" jumped to the top of the Billboard Hot 100 in 1989, seven years after its release.

Track listing 
All songs were written by Arnold Lanni, except where noted.

Personnel 
Freddy Curci – lead vocals
Steve DeMarchi – guitar, backing vocals
Wolf D. Hassel – bass, backing vocals
Arnold Lanni – keyboards, synthesizers, piano, guitar, backing vocals
Rob Elliott – drums

Production 
 Executive Producers: John Victor and Helen Victor
 Engineered by Greg Roberts, assisted by Alyx Skriabow
 Pre-Production at Perceptions Recording Studio, Toronto, Ontario
 Mixed at Electric Lady Studios, New York City
 Mix Engineered by Dave Wittman, assisted by Ed Garcia and Michel Sauvage
 Mastered at Masterdisk, New York City, by Bob Ludwig

Chart positions
Album - Billboard (United States)

Single - Billboard (United States)

References

1982 debut albums
Sheriff (band) albums
Capitol Records albums